The Campagna T-Rex is a two-seat, three-wheeled motor vehicle created by Campagna Motors, located in Quebec, Canada. It is powered by an in-line 6-cylinder engine from BMW. Although it used to be registered as a motorcycle, it is now largely considered a "three-wheeler". However, in some states, like Arizona, it can still be registered as a motorcycle, but not require a motorcycle endorsement. The interior can accommodate the driver and a single passenger seated side-by-side, with adjustable seat backs, a foot-pedal box, and retractable three-point seat belts. The T-Rex uses a sequential manual transmission, operated by hand with a shift lever, which is the same type of manual transmission used in motorcycles.

The T-REX has been commercially available since the early 1990s. The Campagna T-REX was designed and styled by Deutschman Design.

History

In 1976, 1977 and 1979, Daniel Campagna was a Formula Ford racer in Quebec. He made some significant motoring inventions, including the Voodoo in 1982. As part of the technical team for Formula 1 racer Gilles Villeneuve , he handcrafted his first model of the T-REX and subsequently founded his own company, Campagna Moto Sport Inc. in 1990. He brought together a production team and the prototype vehicle was finalized a few years later.

From 1994 to 2000, the T-REX was only available in Quebec, but since the early 2000s it has been sold in the rest of Canada and the United States. In June 2004, the company was facing financial difficulties, and it granted an exclusive worldwide licence to manufacture and sell the T-Rex to T-Rex Vehicles Inc. Due to this arrangement, the company claims that production costs have been reduced by 20% without much difficulty.

In 2001, the T-REX entered the U.S. market, including California CARB certification by 2002.

Since July 2009, the company has 23 employees producing two to three T-REX vehicles per week.

As of 2016, the T-REX was still in production, and since 2011 the company also offered the V13R. Most sales are in Quebec, Canada, and the biggest export market has been the Middle East.

Engines
Examples of different engines employed in the Campagna T-Rex vehicle. Over the course of its production these are some of the different engines that have been used.

Suzuki GSX-R1100 engines
Kawasaki ZX-11
Kawasaki ZX-12R
BMW K1600

See also
List of motorized trikes

References

External links

 

Campagna motorcycles
Motorcycles introduced in 1995
Three-wheeled motor vehicles
Automotive industry in Canada